Nikolai Potapov is a Russian boxer from Podolsk, Russia.

Regional title fights
In 2016, Potapov fought to a draw against Stephon Young for the vacant North American Boxing Association bantamweight title.

On March 10, 2017 Potapov challenged for the North American Boxing Organization bantamweight title against Antonio Nieves on ShoBox.  This was his second appearance on the series.  He won the fight by split decision.

He later vacated the NABO title, but fought for the vacant title in a loss to Joshua Greer Jr.

Professional boxing record

References

External links

1990 births
Living people
Bantamweight boxers
Russian male boxers
People from Podolsk
Sportspeople from Moscow Oblast